High River Regional Airport  is a registered aerodrome located  south southeast of High River, Alberta, Canada.

References

External links
 High River Airport website
Place to Fly on COPA's Places to Fly airport directory

Registered aerodromes in Alberta
Foothills County
High River